Shivahari Poudell, popularly known as Asina Prasad, is a Nepali comic actor, writer and director of Nepali weekly comedy television series Jire khursani & Brake Fail. He has also acted in the 2013 Nepalese movie Chha Ekan Chha and guested on the comedy show Tito Satya.

References

Living people
Nepalese male television actors
21st-century Nepalese male actors
Nepalese film directors
Actors from Kathmandu
Nepalese male film actors
Year of birth missing (living people)
Nepalese male comedians
21st-century Nepalese screenwriters